The Bega Poienilor (also: Bega Mică, in its upper course: Șasa) is the right headwater of the river Bega in Romania. At its confluence with the Bega Luncanilor in Curtea, the Bega is formed.

References

Rivers of Romania
Rivers of Timiș County